"Isn't It a Wonder" is a song by Irish boy band Boyzone from their second studio album, A Different Beat (1996). The song was written by Ronan Keating, Ray Hedges, and Martin Brannigan, and it was produced by Hedges and remixed by Mark "Spike" Stent for its single release. It was released as the album's third single on 10 March 1997 by Polydor Records. The single reached number two on the UK Singles Chart and number three on the Irish Singles Chart.

Critical reception
British magazine Music Week rated "Isn't It a Wonder" four out of five, picking it as Single of the Week and complimenting it as "another faultless ballad". The reviewer added, "As they've already proved, this type of songwriting maturity has an appeal which stretches beyond their original young audience." The magazine's Alan Jones described it as "a gentle, sweetly-sung ballad which their fans will love."

Music video
The accompanying music video for "Isn't It a Wonder" shows four of the Boyzone members riding on a roofless car with Shane Lynch as the driver, Ronan Keating on the right front passenger seat, Stephen Gately on the right rear passenger seat and Mikey Graham on the left rear passenger seat, while Keith Duffy rides separately on a motorcycle. The four members stops at a nearby gasoline station to meet up with Keith Duffy. They travel to certain places that are in the desert. Ronan Keating and Mikey Graham can be seen wearing cowboy hats.

Track listings
 UK CD1 and Australian CD single
 "Isn't It a Wonder" – 3:37
 "Experiencia Religiosa" – 4:17
 "Get Up and Get Over" – 3:14

 UK CD2
 "Isn't It A Wonder" – 3:37
 "A Different Beat" (live at Wembley) – 4:08
 "Temptation" – 3:09
 "Father and Son" (live at Wembley) – 2:48

 European CD single
 "Isn't It a Wonder" – 3:37
 "Experiencia Religiosa" – 4:17

Charts

Weekly charts

Year-end charts

Certifications

References

1990s ballads
1996 songs
1997 singles
Boyzone songs
Polydor Records singles
Song recordings produced by Ray Hedges
Song recordings produced by Spike Stent
Songs written by Martin Brannigan
Songs written by Ray Hedges
Songs written by Ronan Keating